The Best American Poetry 1990, a volume in The Best American Poetry series, was edited by David Lehman and by guest editor Jorie Graham. The book contains seventy-five poems with a range of poet-authors from a college freshman to the 1990 United States Poet Laureate. David Lehman publicly commented that poetry in America retains its vitality for both the poet and reader, after the 1989 series book attained bestseller status.

Graham chose, as one of the best American poems published in the 12-month period, a work by her husband at the time, James Galvin.

Poets and poems included

Most represented publications in this volume
The following publications were represented more than once in this year's volume:

See also
 1990 in poetry

Notes

External links
 Web page for contents of the book, with links to each publication where the poems originally appeared

Best American Poetry series
1990 poetry books
American poetry anthologies